Emiliano Adrián Fusco (born 2 March 1986) is an Argentine football midfielder, who currently plays for Ferrocarril Midland.

External links
Emiliano Fusco at BDFA.com.ar 
Emiliano Fusco – Profile at futbolxxi.com at Fútbol XXI 
Profile at alkifc.com.cy 

1986 births
Living people
Argentine footballers
Association football defenders
Boca Juniors footballers
Argentine expatriate footballers
RCD Mallorca B players
Expatriate footballers in Spain
Expatriate footballers in Cyprus
Alki Larnaca FC players
Bnei Yehuda Tel Aviv F.C. players
Ayia Napa FC players
Argentine Primera División players
ASIL Lysi players
Nea Salamis Famagusta FC players
Club Ferrocarril Midland players
Israeli Premier League players
Cypriot First Division players
Cypriot Second Division players
Sportspeople from Buenos Aires Province